The 2010 Brazilian general election saw Dilma Rousseff of the Workers' Party (PT) elected president.

President

By state

First round

Second round

By municipality

Worldwide results

First round

Second round

Voter demographics

Source:

</ref>

Chamber of Deputies

Senate

References

Elections in Brazil